The 1981 World Junior Curling Championships were held from March 7 to 14 in Megève, France for men's teams only.

Teams

Round robin

  Teams to playoffs
  Teams to tiebreaker

Tiebreaker

Playoffs

Final standings

Awards
 WJCC Sportsmanship Award:  Peter Wilson

All-Star Team:
Skip:  Denis Marchand
Third:  Dale Risling
Second:  Larry Phillips
Lead:  Erik Pettersson

References

External links

J
1981 in French sport
World Junior Curling Championships
Sport in Haute-Savoie
International curling competitions hosted by France
1981 in youth sport
March 1981 sports events in Europe